Scott Houston, also known as "The Piano Guy", is an American pianist, author, teacher and television personality who hosted and co-produced the Public Television series The Piano Guy. He also is the featured performer on a Public Television pledge special titled Play Piano in a Flash. He also created the "Piano In A Flash Online Method", a method for adult piano education.

The Piano Guy
The Piano Guy is a half-hour instructional television series broadcast on Public Broadcasting stations across the US and Canada. The show was produced from the studios of Mills James Productions in Columbus, Ohio.  Mr. Houston has received six in the categories of (Interview-Discussion Program & Host-Moderator-narrator Emmy Awards as Host/Moderator), and the show itself has received two Emmy Awards for production and graphics for a total of 8 Emmys for "The Piano Guy" weekly public TV series. Over 180 episodes were produced while in production over 14 seasons. It offers demonstrations and advice on playing piano informally at various skill levels, with an emphasis on learning to play familiar tunes.

Often, a guest performer is invited to show how they perform a well-known song. Building the interpretation of the song from its melody and chord structure, which can often be found from a lead sheet, the guest will demonstrate different techniques and improvisations that add their own artistic influences onto their cover of the song. Each segment with a guest performer ends with their performance of the song.

Guest Performers
David Benoit
Andy LaVerne
Jack Widner
Andy Launer
Dave Powers
Matt Munhall
Bradley Sowash
Dave Bott
Pete Moran
Oksana Kolesnikova
Mary Daniels
David Tolley
Bobby Floyd
Nat Kerr
Gary Walters
Lori Mechem
Casey McKewen

References

External links
 Scott The Piano Guy homepage
 Online site to view episodes of The Piano Guy TV series
 Scott "The Piano Guy" Houston radio interview with Doug Miles
Scott Houston Interview - NAMM Oral History Library (2012)

Living people
American male pianists
21st-century American pianists
21st-century American male musicians
Year of birth missing (living people)